"Fuel to the Fire" is a single by Music for Pleasure and was released in 1981.

Track listing
All songs written and composed by Mark Copson, Martin King, Christopher Oldroyd and David Whitaker.

Rage Records 7" Single: RAGE 2

Personnel
 Mark Copson - vocals
 Christopher Oldroyd - drums
 Martin King - bass guitar
 David Whitaker - keyboards

Production
 John Leckie - producer
 Murray Harris - engineer
 Mark Manning - sleeve design

References

1981 songs
Music for Pleasure (band) songs
Song recordings produced by John Leckie